Achille Pensy Moukembe (born 5 January 1987) is a Cameroonian-born naturalized Equatoguinean professional football goalkeeper. He currently plays for Deportivo Niefang in the First Division.

Career

International career
Pensy was a member of Cameroon at the 2001 African U-17 Championship and the 2001 Meridian Cup.

While playing in the Equatoguinean First Division, he was naturalized and began to be called constantly by Equatorial Guinea. Pensy appeared as a substitute in three matches for the 2010 FIFA World Cup qualifiers in 2008. He played against Mali and Estonia in 2009 and against Morocco and Botswana in 2010.

Also, Pensy played in unofficial matches against Ivory Coast, at the 2009 and 2010 CEMAC Cup and against the French club FC Issy-les-Moulineaux.

References

External links

1987 births
Living people
People from Littoral Region (Cameroon)
Equatoguinean footballers
Equatorial Guinea international footballers
Cameroonian footballers
Cameroon youth international footballers
Cameroonian emigrants to Equatorial Guinea
Naturalized citizens of Equatorial Guinea
Association football goalkeepers
Akonangui FC players
The Panthers F.C. players
2012 Africa Cup of Nations players
Deportivo Mongomo players
AD Racing de Micomeseng players
Deportivo Niefang players